Sequatchie County is a county located in the U.S. state of Tennessee. As of the 2020 census, the population was 15,826. Its county seat is Dunlap. Sequatchie County is part of the Chattanooga, TN–GA Metropolitan Statistical Area.

History

Sequatchie County was created in 1857 from two districts of Marion County and one district of Bledsoe County. It was named for the Sequatchie Valley, which in turn had been named for a Cherokee chief. Settlers began arriving in what is now Sequatchie by the early 19th century, drawn to the area by the fertile land in the valley.

At the outset of the Civil War, Sequatchie was divided over the issue of secession.  On June 8, 1861, Sequatchie Countians voted in favor of Tennessee's Ordinance of Secession by a vote 153 to 100.  In October 1863, Confederate General Joseph Wheeler led a raid into Sequatchie, burning nearly a thousand wagons and capturing livestock.

During the late 19th century, the Douglas Coal and Coke Company (later the Chattanooga Iron and Coal Corporation) conducted extensive mining activities in the Dunlap area.  The company constructed 268 beehive ovens, now known as the Dunlap Coke Ovens, to convert coal into coke.  The ovens are now the focus of a local park.

Geography

Sequatchie is one of three counties (along with Bledsoe and Marion) situated in the Sequatchie Valley, a long, narrow valley running northeast-to-southwest across the eastern portion of the Cumberland Plateau. The county is flanked by the Plateau's Walden Ridge escarpment on the east.  The Sequatchie River, which spans the valley, passes through the county.

Two major highways, U.S. Route 127 and Tennessee State Route 111, intersect in Dunlap.

While the two other counties in the Sequatchie Valley, Bledsoe and Marion, are grouped with the East Tennessee grand division, Sequatchie is grouped with Middle Tennessee.

Adjacent counties
Van Buren County (north)
Bledsoe County (northeast)
Hamilton County (southeast/EST Border)
Marion County (southwest)
Grundy County (west)
Warren County (northwest)

State protected areas
North Chickamauga Creek State Natural Area (part)
Prentice Cooper State Forest (part)
Savage Gulf State Natural Area (part)
South Cumberland State Park (part)

Demographics

2020 census

As of the 2020 United States census, there were 15,826 people, 5,528 households, and 4,192 families residing in the county.

2010 census
As of the census of 2010, there were 14,112 people, 4,463 households, and 3,311 families residing in the county. There were 4,916 housing units at an average density of 18 per square mile (7/km2). The racial makeup of the county was 98.66% White, 0.19% Black or African American, 0.33% Native American, 0.13% Asian, 0.03% Pacific Islander, 0.17% from other races, and 0.48% from two or more races.  0.82% of the population were Hispanic or Latino of any race. Sequatchie County was mentioned as an "Extreme Whitopia" in Rich Benjamin's book, Searching for Whitopia.

There were 4,463 households, out of which 33.00% had children under the age of 18 living with them, 58.80% were married couples living together, 11.20% had a female householder with no husband present, and 25.80% were non-families. 22.40% of all households were made up of individuals, and 8.80% had someone living alone who was 65 years of age or older.  The average household size was 2.52 and the average family size was 2.92.

In the county, the population was spread out, with 24.60% under the age of 18, 8.40% from 18 to 24, 30.00% from 25 to 44, 24.80% from 45 to 64, and 12.30% who were 65 years of age or older.  The median age was 37 years. For every 100 females there were 98.30 males.  For every 100 females age 18 and over, there were 95.80 males.

The median income for a household in the county was $30,959, and the median income for a family was $36,435. Males had a median income of $27,535 versus $20,422 for females. The per capita income for the county was $16,468.  About 13.50% of families and 16.50% of the population were below the poverty line, including 21.50% of those under age 18 and 20.30% of those age 65 or over.

Education

Sequatchie County has a consolidated school system which is located in Dunlap. The system operates with a superintendent and an elected school board.

The Sequatchie County school system has three schools:

 Griffith Elementary School (grades: K–4th)
 Sequatchie County Middle School (grades: 5th–8th)
 Sequatchie County High School (grades: 9th–12th)

Recreation

Sequatchie County is known as "The Hang Gliding Capital of the East", due in part to the presence of an active hang gliding association, the Tennessee Tree Toppers.  This group maintains a hang gliding ramp at Henson's Gap, along the eastern wall of the Sequatchie Valley, where favorable flying conditions allow these unpowered aircraft to fly well into northwestern Georgia and northeastern Alabama after launch.  The gap is the site of numerous hang gliding competitions, and is a popular tourist attraction for aficionados of the sport from all over the world.

Communities

City
Dunlap (county seat)

Census-designated place
Lone Oak

Unincorporated communities
Brush Creek
Cagle
Lewis Chapel

Media

Sequatchie County is served by numerous local, regional and national media outlets which reach approximately one million people in four states including: Tennessee, Alabama, Georgia and North Carolina.

Newspapers
 The Dunlap Tribune: The periodical focuses its energy on highlighting events, sports and people in Dunlap, TN and Sequatchie County.

Radio
Sequatchie County is part of the Chattanooga Arbitron radio market. The following radio stations are licensed to cities within Sequatchie County:

AM
 WSDQ 1190 AM – Country (Licensed to Dunlap)

FM
 W227DM 93.3 - Country Roads 93.3 WSDQ (FM translator for WSDQ-AM Licensed to Dunlap)

Notable people
Phil Douglas,(1890–1952), was a Major League Baseball player best remember for his time with the World Series Champion New York Giants.
Dakota Hudson (1994–present), professional baseball player for St. Louis Cardinals
James Standifer (1779–1837), U.S. congressman
William Stone (1791–1853), U.S. congressman

Politics

See also
National Register of Historic Places listings in Sequatchie County, Tennessee

References

External links

 Official site
 Sequatchie County Chamber of Commerce
 Sequatchie County Schools
 Sequatchie County, TNGenWeb - free genealogy resources for the county

 
1857 establishments in Tennessee
Tennessee placenames of Native American origin
Populated places established in 1857
Chattanooga metropolitan area counties
Counties of Appalachia
Second Amendment sanctuaries in Tennessee
Middle Tennessee